Njonja Tjoa Hin Hoei ( 1907–1990), who was born Kwee Yat Nio and was also known by the Buddhist name Visakha Gunadharma, was a Chinese Indonesian journalist, writer, Buddhist figure, and political activist during the late colonial and early independence periods. She was especially known for being publisher and editor of a women's magazine  which ran from the 1930s to the early 1950s.

Biography
She was born Kwee Yat Nio in 1906 or 1907 in Buitenzorg, Dutch East Indies (today Bogor, Indonesia). She was the oldest child of Kwee Tek Hoay, was a multilingual Peranakan Chinese journalist, writer and translator. She was educated in Buitenzorg at a Tiong Hoa Hwee Koan school and then at an English-language Methodist school, which she graduated from in 1924; she then became a teacher there. Even while she was still a student her father encouraged her to read and write and to translate English-language news from foreign sources for Malay-language newspapers such as Sin Po. In the early 1920s she founded a women's organization named  (sisters' association); its goal was to unite unmarried Peranakan girls and promote their education and development. In 1925 she married Tjoa Hin Hoei, a man from Lampung, Sumatra who had also studied at the THHK school in Buitenzorg. She left her teaching job at the Methodist school and they relocated to Batavia where she started teaching in an English school.

Tjoa Hin Hoei.

During the prewar years she was very active in Chinese political organizations in Java. From 1934 to 1938 she was secretary of the Buddhist Association in Batavia. And from 1932 to 1940 she was chair of the Chinese Women's Association in Batavia.

It was printed in Malay (Indonesian) and was aimed mainly at Peranakan Chinese women, especially those who were not educated enough to be able to read Dutch. Eventually it seems to have become popular among Indonesian women as well; in turn, Tjoa advocated for good relations between them and Chinese women, and an awareness of their situation.  published fiction, film reviews, recipes, fashion, and educational content about children's health and women's status; the majority of the content was written by Tjoa herself. Tjoa's editorial line was not always a radical one; she believed that women should be modest and follow traditional Chinese values, and that education was useful to create ideal wives and daughters. Among its editorial board was Thung Sin Nio, a Dutch-educated medical doctor. Another reason for its longevity is that the magazine had the support of the mainstream Peranakan community in Batavia, including the THHK and Chung Hwa Hui. This support also allowed Tjoa and other writers to publish under their own names; at the time it was still common for women writers in the Indies to publish under pseudonyms.

In 1940 Tjoa had legal difficulties as editor of the magazine when it was deemed to have printed defamatory material under the Indies' strict censorship laws. The court eventually found the case inadmissible. The magazine ceased publication during the Japanese occupation and Indonesian National Revolution and restarted after independence. At some point during the early- or mid-1950s it closed due to money problems and paper shortages. The death of her husband Tjoa Hin Hoei in 1956 may also have been a factor.

Following independence she was also active in a number of Chinese Indonesian and Buddhist organizations. She was also chair of the women's section of the Consultative Council for Indonesian Citizenship from 1956 to 1964.

Following the Transition to the New Order, many Chinese Indonesian organizations were closed by the dictatorship; after that she mostly focused on the publication of religious materials and remained active in local Buddhist organizations in Jakarta. After 1973 she became a deputy leader in the newly founded Indonesian Buddhist Women's Fellowship. During this period she adopted the Indonesian or Buddhist name Visakha Gunadharma.

She died on 26 September 1990 (some sources incorrectly give the year as 1993). She left an autobiography which is as of yet unpublished.

Family
Kwee and Tjoa had five children; daughters Lenny Tjoa Keng Yin, Effie Tjoa Keng Loan, Yenny Tjoa Keng Lan and sons Tjoa Keng Pen and Tjoa Keng Hok. Lenny and Effie were well known as classical musicians during the post-independence era.

References 

1900s births
Year of birth uncertain
1990 deaths
People from Bogor
20th-century Indonesian women writers
Chinese Indonesian culture
Indonesian Buddhists
Indonesian people of Chinese descent
20th-century Dutch East Indies people
Indonesian women journalists
Indonesian magazine editors
Journalists from the Dutch East Indies